Inglewood United Football Club is an Australian semi-professional soccer club based in Inglewood, a suburb of Perth, Western Australia. The club competes in the National Premier Leagues Western Australia. The club is based at Inglewood Stadium.

Inglewood have won the State League Premier League once, in 1996, and the State Cup twice, in 1977 and 1999. Their most recent success was in the 2021 NPL Night Series when they beat Perth Soccer Club 2–0 in a convincing win. They last won the Night Series in 2005 when they lifted the trophy by defeating Swan I.C. 3–0.

History
Kiev Soccer Club was founded in March 1951 by Alexander Minko and Igor Schorsch, migrants from Ukraine. The club took its name from Kyiv, the capital of Ukraine, and the famous Dynamo Kyiv team.

Their playing colours of gold and blue were adopted from the Ukrainian national flag in the late 1960s. The clubs' original playing strip was all-black.

Kiev's first competitive game was on 12 April 1953 when they claimed a 3–1 victory over Wundowie in Division Three North of the Western Australian Soccer Football Association.

In 1962 Kiev entered Division One of the newly formed Western Australian Soccer Federation. The club finished second to Swan Valley to gain promotion to the top flight for the first time.

For the next few years they bounced between the top two tiers, changing their name from Kiev to Kiev-Victoria Park and then back to Kiev.

Spells at Langley Park in Perth, Weston Street in Carlisle and Raphael Park in Victoria Park preceded the club's 1963 relocation to Walter Road Reserve (now Inglewood Stadium) in Inglewood, which remains their home ground to this day.

1964 saw Kiev capture their first trophy by finishing top of Division One, with State representative Peter Atkinson voted the league's Player of the Year. Another second tier championship followed in 1967.

Kiev announced their top flight return by placing second to Perth Azzurri on the 1968 league table. They went on to win the Top Four Cup, downing Cracovia 2–1 in the final courtesy of a Bev Allan double.

1970 brought about another name change – to Inglewood Kiev – and within twelve months a 21-year lease was arranged for the use of Walter Road Reserve.

Striker Len Dundo scored himself a hat-trick of Golden Boots as the top flight's leading goal scorer in 1972, 1973 and 1974. In those three seasons alone Dundo amassed 77 goals for Inglewood.

The fundraising efforts of long-time club secretary Jack Soer were instrumental in ensuring the club maintained a strong financial position throughout the 1970s.

Inglewood commemorated their 25th anniversary with the construction of clubrooms at the northern end of the ground, under the guidance of Vladimir Mandyczewsky. The new bar and office facilities were officially opened in November 1976.

1977 will long be remembered as the year Inglewood truly came of age. Robert Earl (3) and Nick Macallum (2) may have scored the goals in a 5–1 State Cup final mauling of Spearwood Dalmatinac but it was defender Jimmy Smith who was recognised as best on ground.

English import Gordon Todd celebrated his first State League season by taking out the Gold Medal, awarded to the top flights’ best player. John Davidson ensured the year ended on a high by scoring the solitary goal in a 1–0 Top Four Cup victory over Floreat Athena.

Lee Adam created State League history by becoming the first player to collect two Gold Medals, the midfielder winning the prestigious award in 1978 and again in 1980.

Memories of England's 1966 World Cup win were revived in mid-1981 when team captain Bobby Moore joined Inglewood for two guest appearances.

Midfield livewire Norrie Sutton became Inglewood's fourth Gold Medal winner in six seasons when he won the award in 1982.

Inglewood lifted their first Night Series trophy in 1983. A Paddy Morris goal in the first period of extra-time was enough to gain a 1–0 win over West Perth Macedonia. Further success eluded the club in the years that followed, culminating in relegation to the second tier in 1987.

It wasn't until a competition restructure in 1993, brought on by the formation of new peak body the Professional Soccer Federation, that top flight football returned to Inglewood. The following year new president Siggy Kramer secured a new 10-year lease on Walter Road Reserve.

The club entered 1995 as Inglewood Falcons and ended it as Premier League runners-up and Top Four Cup finalists. Jason Ainsley was the runaway winner of that season's Gold Medal.

Inglewood reached the State League pinnacle by winning the 1996 Premier League under the management of Paul Wormley. Goals in the final minutes of the season by Scott Daley and veteran Ian Ballantyne earned the club a 2–1 victory over near-neighbours Bayswater City, and their first league title. Norrie Sutton collected his second Gold Medal, Ronnie More was named Goalkeeper of the Year and Paul Wormley the Coach of the Year.

The State Cup returned to Inglewood in 1999 courtesy of Gavin Tait, whose second half header was enough to see off Floreat Athena 1–0.

A rebranding to Inglewood United in 2000 preceded the negotiation of a new 25-year lease on Walter Road Reserve. The following year the club celebrated their 50th anniversary with the opening of a new 1,000-seat stadium, the Kramer Family Stand, on the western side of Walter Road Reserve.

Although recognised as one of the State League's powerhouse clubs, Inglewood's only trophy capture of recent times has been the 2021 WA NPL Night Series.

By contrast, individual accolades have flowed for Inglewood players. Robert Zabica (2000), Oliver Taseski (2001, 2009 and 2011) and Alex Dunn (2018, 2019, 2020) were honoured with the Goalkeeper of the Year award, Louis Parkinson (2003), Jack Clisby (2012) and Alex Salmon (2017) added their names to the Gold Medal winners list, with the latter also scoring the Golden Boot (2017).

Honours
National Premier Leagues Western Australia Champions: 1996

National Premier Leagues Western Australia Runners-up: 1968, 1977, 1994, 1995, 2016, 2017, 2019

State Cup Winners: 1977, 1999

State Cup Runners-up: 1981, 1995, 2005, 2009

Top Four Cup Winners: 1968, 1977

Top Four Cup Runners-up: 1982, 2008, 1994, 1995, 1996, 2016, 2019

Night Series Winners: 1983, 2005, 2021

Night Series Runners-up: 1976, 1979, 1997, 2000

Division One Champions: 1964, 1967

Division One Runners-up: 1962

Division Three Cup Winners: 1959

Current squad

Coaching staff
Technical Director: Macca Leeson
First Team Coach: Andres Oliveira
First Team Assistant Coach: Jason Colli
First Team Physio: Katie Holtham
Goalkeeper Coach: Dave Whalley

Season by season record

Key

Coaches and players

Head coach
Listed according to first competitive game as Head Coach:
(C) – Caretaker

Player of the Year

Notable past players
List includes players from Inglewood youth or senior teams that have gone on to represent the Australian national team or similar, or have amassed over 100 games with Perth Glory FC or similar.

 Gary Marocchi
 Robert Zabica 
 Alan MacKenzie 
 Bobby Despotovski (also has the all-time goal-scoring record with Perth Glory FC)
 Nikita Rukavytsya
 David Cyrus
 Lewis Italiano

References

External links
 Club website
 Statistics from OzFootball
 footballwa.net Club Directory entry
 Українська футбольна діаспора

National Premier Leagues clubs
Football West State League teams
Association football clubs established in 1951
Ukrainian association football clubs outside Ukraine
1951 establishments in Australia